Brooklyn Park is a census-designated place (CDP) in Anne Arundel County, Maryland, United States. The population was 14,373 at the 2010 census.

Geography
Brooklyn Park is located at  (39.224857, −76.612655) on the northern edge of Anne Arundel County and borders the city of Baltimore along its southern boundary of 1919. The CDP is bordered as well by Interstate 695 (the Baltimore Beltway) to the south, by Maryland Route 648 (Baltimore Annapolis Boulevard) to the west, and by the Patapsco River, which forms the Anne Arundel County/Baltimore County boundary, to the northwest.

Within the Baltimore city limits, adjacent to the CDP, are the older neighborhoods of Brooklyn (founded 1853), Curtis Bay (development proposed in 1874, buildings began in 1889), and several smaller communities that are now defunct: Fairfield, Masonville, Wagner's Point (also known as East Brooklyn), Arundel Cove, and Hawkins Point.

The Brooklyn Park CDP in Anne Arundel County is composed of several smaller neighborhoods: old Brooklyn Park (west of Gov. Ritchie Highway - Maryland Route 2), Brooklyn Heights (east of Gov. Ritchie Highway), Arundel Village (along and north of Church Street), Roland Terrace (along and south of Church Street), Arundel Gardens (southwest of Gov. Ritchie Highway and south of Hammonds Lane), and Pumphrey, which lies along Belle Grove Road, south of the Patapsco River.

A History of Brooklyn-Curtis Bay, of approximately 200 pages, was published in September 1976, in celebration of the American Bicentennial by the members of the Brooklyn-Curtis Bay Historical Committee. Brooklyn Park has many different types of buildings such as schools and senior centers.

Demographics

As of the census of 2000, there were 10,938 people, 4,093 households, and 2,910 families residing in the CDP. The racial makeup of the CDP was 92.15% White, 4.21% African American, 0.48% Native American, 1.50% Asian, 0.04% Pacific Islander, 0.58% from other races, and 1.05% from two or more races. Hispanic or Latino of any race were 1.59% of the population.

There were 4,093 households, out of which 30.6% had children under the age of 18 living with them, 50.2% were married couples living together, 15.1% had a female householder with no husband present, and 28.9% were non-families. 22.8% of all households were made up of individuals, and 11.2% had someone living alone who was 65 years of age or older. The average household size was 2.67 and the average family size was 3.10.

In the CDP, the population was spread out, with 24.9% under the age of 18, 8.0% from 18 to 24, 28.9% from 25 to 44, 22.2% from 45 to 64, and 16.0% who were 65 years of age or older. The median age was 38 years. For every 100 females, there were 94.8 males. For every 100 females age 18 and over, there were 90.5 males.

The median income for a household in the CDP was $42,207, and the median income for a family was $50,496. Males had a median income of $33,476 versus $26,316 for females. The per capita income for the CDP was $18,582. About 6.6% of families and 8.0% of the population were below the poverty line, including 13.5% of those under age 18 and 6.3% of those age 65 or over.

By the 2010 census, the local population had grown and changed substantially.  In 2010 Brooklyn Park had 14,373 people, 5,158 households and 3,634 families.  The racial makeup of the CDP was 76.8% White, 18.6% African American, 6% Latino, and 3.4% Asian (NB: some Latinos had responded as both Latino and white).

See also
Brooklyn, Baltimore
Curtis Bay, Baltimore

References

External links

Census-designated places in Maryland
Census-designated places in Anne Arundel County, Maryland